Lamhe (lit. Moments) is a 1991 Indian musical romantic drama film directed by Yash Chopra and written by Honey Irani and Rahi Masoom Raza. The film stars Sridevi and Anil Kapoor in lead roles, along with Waheeda Rehman and Anupam Kher in pivotal supporting roles. In the film, Viren (Kapoor) falls for Pallavi (Sridevi), but she marries someone else. However, Pallavi and her husband die in a car accident, leaving behind their daughter (also Sridevi) in care of Viren, who grows up to look just like her mother and falls in love with Viren. The film marks the second and final collaboration between Sridevi and Chopra, after Chandni (1989).

Produced by Chopra under his production banner Yash Raj Films, Lamhe was shot in two schedules in Rajasthan, India and London, United Kingdom. Over the years, it has been hailed as an all-time classic and Chopra's finest film. Although the film did moderate business domestically, it became a major success overseas, bringing in a worldwide gross of 20.5 crores on a production budget of 6 crores; thus becoming the 10th highest grossing Indian film of 1991. It received widespread critical acclaim upon release, with high praise directed towards Sridevi for her double-role as mother and daughter.

A recipient of several accolades, Lamhe won Best Costume Design at the 39th National Film Awards. Additionally, at the 37th Filmfare Awards, the film received a leading 13 nominations, including Best Director (Chopra), Best Actor (Kapoor), Best Supporting Actress (Rehman) and Best Supporting Actor (Kher), and won a leading 5 awards – Best Film, Best Actress (Sridevi), Best Comedian (Kher), Best Story (Irani) and Best Dialogue (Masoom Raza).

Lamhe featured on Outlook's list of Bollywood's Best Films. It has been cited as Chopra's personal favorite of the films he has made. This was one of the last films scripted by Masoom Raza; he died a couple of months after its release. On the occasion of the Centenary of Indian Cinema in 2013, Lamhe featured among the Top 10 Romantic Movies Of 100 Years.

Plot 
A young Virendra "Viren" Pratap Singh visits Rajasthan for the first time where he is greeted by his governess, affectionately called Dai Jaa. His parents migrated to London before he was born. Initially, he is put off by the hot weather and the customs of the region, but soon begins to respect the place and the people. He meets the beautiful Pallavi and falls in love with her. Pallavi is the daughter of a businessman who had helped Viren's father when his business was suffering. Viren and Pallavi become friends. However, upon noticing Viren's feelings for Pallavi, Dai Jaa indicates that Pallavi is older than him, which does not bother him.

After losing a civil court case involving his property, Pallavi's father dies of a heart attack. Pallavi goes into depression. Viren comes to console her only to find her run to Siddharth, the man she loves. Viren is heartbroken but arranges her wedding to Siddharth and moves back to London. Tragedy strikes a year later when Pallavi and Siddharth die in a car accident. Their newborn baby, Pooja, survives and is placed in the care of Dai Jaa.

In London, Viren spends time with his childhood friend Prem, and over the course of time, slowly gets back to reality and makes new friends, including a girlfriend, Anita. He visits Rajasthan every year for Pallavi's death anniversary, and to buy gifts for the young Pooja. He never spends time with Pooja because she was born the same day Pallavi died and the pain and trauma of her death is still fresh in his mind. 

However, 20 years later, he ends up meeting the now grown-up Pooja and is shocked to see the resemblance she shares with her mother. Dai Jaa and Pooja visit London and meet Anita. Anita realizes that Viren may never forget Pallavi because of how Pooja is a constant reminder of her.

Pooja is unaware of Viren's feelings towards her mother and falls in love with Viren. Prem understands how much Pooja is attached to Viren, but is skeptical since Viren is still living in the past. Anita realizes that Viren might be falling for Pooja and tells him he should be ashamed of having feelings for a considerably younger woman, due to the fact that she resembles her dead mother whom he loved.

Pooja finds Viren's pencil sketch of Pallavi and misunderstands that it is her portrait when it really is her mother's. She confesses her love for him, but a furious Viren reveals that he only loved her mother. A humiliated Pooja asks Dai Jaa to return to India.

Back home, Dai Jaa persuades Pooja to marry. Pooja agrees on the condition that Viren marry first. In London, Prem advises a confused Viren to confront his feelings towards Pooja. When Dai Jaa calls to let Viren know that Pooja has agreed to marry once Viren ties the knot, Viren agrees to marry Anita. Upon hearing this, Pooja tells Dai Jaa that she does not want to ever marry. 

Back in London, Viren and Prem are wondering why Dai Jaa is postponing her visit to London. They decide to go back to India and surprise her. When they arrive, Dai Jaa informs them that Pooja has vowed not to marry. Viren confronts Pooja and confesses to her that he did not marry Anita, since he realized he was in love with Pooja, and they finally get married.

Cast 
 Sridevi as Pallavi Thakur Bhatnagar & Pooja Bhatnagar; (as both mother and daughter)
 Anil Kapoor as Virendra Pratap Singh (a.k.a. Viren / Kunwarji)
 Waheeda Rehman as Durga Devi (a.k.a. Dai Jaa); Viren, and later Pooja's governess
 Anupam Kher as Prem Anand; Viren's best friend
 Deepak Malhotra as Siddharth Kumar Bhatnagar; Pallavi's husband and Pooja's father
 Dippy Sagoo as Anita Malhotra; Viren's girlfriend
 Manohar Singh as Kothiwale Thakur; Pallavi's father
 Lalit Tiwari as Sudheshwar Narayan Tiwari
 Ila Arun as a folk dancer in the song "Morni Baga Ma Bole"
 Richa Pallod as young Pooja
 Vikas Anand as Doctor Vikas; Pallavi's doctor

Music 
The music was composed by Shiv Kumar Sharma and Hariprasad Chaurasia (together known as Shiv-Hari) and the lyrics were provided by Anand Bakshi. The song "Kabhi Main Kahoon" was composed from a melody used as background music in Chopra's Chandni (1989), also scored by Shiv-Hari. In the famous parody sequence, Rehman danced to "Aaj Phir Jeene Ki Tamanna Hai" – her signature song from the all-time classic Guide (1965).

The songs included on the official soundtrack are listed here:

Reception, analysis and legacy 
Lamhe is one of the few films that picked up the Filmfare Award for Best Film, despite its moderate business in India. It is also one of the biggest Bollywood hits in the overseas market and the video circuit. Sridevi received widespread critical acclaim for her double-role as mother and daughter, winning the Filmfare Award for Best Actress among others. It was also listed in Outlook magazine's list of All-Time Great Indian Films. It has been cited as Chopra's personal favorite among his directorial ventures. The Times of India included it in its list of 'Top 10 Films of Yash Chopra' describing it as "a tale of love transcending the boundaries of time and space", while Rediff called it "Quite easily one of his most definitive films, Chopra surpassed his own findings of romance with the insightful, lovely Lamhe." Hrithik Sharma from El Viaje Reviews says "The cinematography is a treat to eyes. Editing is crisp, but with nearly 3 hours of run-time, it requires patience to watch the whole film. Only Chopra could create this bold and unheard story in a way, that otherwise would have not been received well."

Sridevi played both mother and daughter in what iDiva described as "another double-role but it was unlike any played before." Hailed by Rediff as "one of the most remarkable films of her career... often considered a film way ahead of its time." Her performance brought her high critical acclaim, with BizAsia stating that "Her rendition of both Pallavi and Pooja serves well in highlighting how versatile she is as an actress, playing contrasting characters in the same film." Speaking to Karan Johar about the making of Lamhe, Chopra revealed, "When 90% of the London schedule was over, a tragedy took place. Sridevi's father died... She came back after 16 days and had to shoot a comedy scene... At that moment, she forgot everything and gave a wonderful scene. I understood that is the secret of her success... Why she is what she is." Sridevi's folk dance number "Morni Baga Ma Bole" was placed among the 'Top 5 Songs of Yash Chopra' by Hindustan Times.

Over the years, Lamhe has become a cult classic. Critic Rachel Dwyer wrote in her biography of the filmmaker "Yash Chopra's own favorite film, Lamhe (Moments (1991)), divided the audience on a class basis: it was hugely popular with the metropolitan elites and the overseas market, which allowed it to break even, but it had a poor box-office response (especially the repeat audience), because of its supposed incest theme." The Hindu reported that "With shades of incest, Lamhe caused more than a flutter and remained the talk of the town", while Sridevi herself admitted in an interview with Rajeev Masand that she found the subject "too bold". Rediff described its failure as "one of those bizarre, unexplained moments of cinema." Many film analysts, including Vikram Bhatt, felt that Lamhe was ahead of its time, and if released at a later period, would have been a success.

Awards and nominations 
39th National Film Awards:
Best Costume Design – Neeta Lulla, Kachins & Leena Daru

37th Filmfare Awards:
Won
 Best Film – Yash Chopra
 Best Actress – Sridevi
 Best Comedian – Anupam Kher
 Best Story – Honey Irani
 Best Dialogue – Rahi Masoom Raza

Nominated
 Best Director – Yash Chopra
 Best Actor – Anil Kapoor
 Best Supporting Actress – Waheeda Rehman
 Best Supporting Actor – Anupam Kher
 Best Music Director – Shiv-Hari
 Best Lyricist – Anand Bakshi for "Kabhi Main Kahoon"
 Best Male Playback Singer – Hariharan for "Kabhi Main Kahoon"
 Best Cinematography – Manmohan Singh

References

External links 
 
 Bonobology.com: "6 Bollywood movies where the lead characters have had a huge age difference"

1991 films
1990s Hindi-language films
Films directed by Yash Chopra
Yash Raj Films films
Films set in Rajasthan
Films shot in India
Films shot in London
Indian romantic drama films
1991 romantic drama films
Films scored by Shiv-Hari
Films that won the Best Costume Design National Film Award
Sexuality and age in fiction